The following are the national records in athletics in Fiji maintained by Fiji's national athletics federation: Athletics Fiji (AF).

Outdoor

Key to tables:

ht = hand timing

A = affected by altitude

# = not ratified by federation

y = denotes one mile/ 440 yards

OT = oversized track (> 200m in circumference)

Men

†: 3:07.73 by another source.

Women

‡: another source states 17 March 2013.

Indoor

Men

Women

References
General
Fijian Records – Men 6 March 2020 updated
Fijian Records – Women 19 July 2019 updated
Specific

External links
AF web site

Fiji
Records
Athletics
athletics